Pont-Saint-Martin (Valdôtain:  or ;  or )) is a town and comune in the Aosta Valley region of northwest Italy.

It is home to the notable Roman bridge of the same name, and to two ruined medieval castles (Castle of Pont-Saint-Martin and Castle of Suzey). The communal territory is crossed by the Dora Baltea river and has its highest peak at the Bec di Nona mountain, elevation .

Twin towns
 Pont-Saint-Martin, France
 Bétera, Spain

 
Cities and towns in Aosta Valley